Balls of Steel Australia is an Australian reality comedy television series (based upon the UK series of the same name) which is hosted by The Chaser's Craig Reucassel. The show revolves around comedians who appear and present individual skits where they would perform stunts and hold their nerve during hidden camera set-ups in the presence of the Australian public.

The format was acquired, commissioned and developed by The Comedy Channel Group Programming Director Darren Chau who selected Endemol Southern Star to produce it. Balls of Steel Australia premiered on the Australian subscription television channel The Comedy Channel on 19 April 2011. Ten episodes were produced for the inaugural season. Due to the success of series one, which became The Comedy Channel's highest ever rating series, a second series was commissioned, and premiered on 31 January 2012. The show won an Astra Award.

Overview 
During the course of each episode, four acts are presented by their corresponding comedian. Each comedian has a brief banter with host Reucassel before and after each skit. At the end of each episode the studio audience is asked to decide which act had the biggest 'Balls of Steel' by voting with their mobile phones.

Series one initially started with ten different comedians and their corresponding acts. Neg Dupree reprises his role with the Urban Sports segment from the original UK version. The series also has Australian local versions of "The Annoying Devil" and "Bunny Boiler". It also featured many exclusive acts only seen on this version of the show though some take in similar ideas and formats from many previous acts from the UK version. In addition, a studio based segment called "Show Us Your Balls" was created, where people in the audience are asked to participate and will be competing among the other comedians of the show. This segment is presented by host Reucassel.

Series two sees some changes to the line up of comedians and their acts. Katia Taylor will not return to reprise her role as "Nude Girl" but instead will be replaced by the "Nude Twins". Other comedians who didn't return were Janis McGavin and Rachael Coopes. John Burgess replaces James Kerley as "The Game Show Host from Hell". New comedians and acts for this series includes Olivia Lee from the original UK series, "The Misfits Stunt Crew" and Imaan Hadchiti as "Short Tempered". Returning acts include the "Bunny Boiler", "Very Foreign Correspondent", "Neg's Urban Sports Down Under", and "Just Come Out".

Performers and acts

Series overview

Season one (2011)

Season two (2012)

Reception 
It is the highest rating show in the history of The Comedy Channel, doubling the ratings of the previous record holder The Merrick and Rosso Show. Due to the popularity of the first series, a second series premiered in January 2012.

Garnier also became its sponsor for its second series with John Burgess acting as the spokesperson and promoter in the commercial for Garnier Men Mineral Deodorants.

It won the award for Most Outstanding Light Entertainment Program at the 2012 Astra Awards.

References

External links
 

2011 Australian television series debuts
2012 Australian television series endings
2010s Australian comedy television series
2010s LGBT-related comedy television series
2010s Australian reality television series
Australian LGBT-related television shows
Australian television series based on British television series
English-language television shows
Hidden camera television series
Nudity in television
Television series by Endemol Australia
The Comedy Channel original programming